Mary Channing Wister School, originally the Mary Channing Wister Public School, is a historic school building located in the Poplar neighborhood of Philadelphia, Pennsylvania. It was designed by Irwin T. Catharine and built in 1925–1926. It is a three-story, three bay, brick building on a raised basement in the Art Deco-style. An addition was built in 1960. It features a freestanding portico with Doric order columns and decorative tile. It is named for the civic leader Mary Channing Wister, the wife of Owen Wister.

It was added to the National Register of Historic Places in 1988.

In 2001, the building was renovated to become a new forensic science laboratory for the Philadelphia Police Department. While the facade remains true to the original design with little change, the inside of the building was completely renovated and designated a Green building.  The new laboratory is called the Forensic Science Center, operated by the Office of Forensic Science within the Philadelphia Police Department.

References

School buildings on the National Register of Historic Places in Philadelphia
Art Deco architecture in Pennsylvania
School buildings completed in 1926
Poplar, Philadelphia
Philadelphia Police Department
1926 establishments in Pennsylvania